Daniel F. Petersen (born 23 April 1951) is an American former politician.

Daniel Petersen was born in Davenport, Iowa, to parents Floyd and Mardelle Petersen on 23 April 1951. He was raised in Muscatine, where he graduated from Muscatine High School in 1969, then earned a bachelor's degree from Iowa State University in 1973. Petersen was a farmer.

Petersen was elected to the Iowa House of Representatives in a 1985 special election necessitated after the resignation of Janis Torrence from the District 57 seat. Thereafter, he was elected to three full terms in his own right, serving until 1993.

References

Iowa State University alumni
1951 births
Living people
20th-century American politicians
Farmers from Iowa
Republican Party members of the Iowa House of Representatives
Politicians from Davenport, Iowa
Muscatine High School alumni